Francisco 'Paco' Bautista is an IFBB professional bodybuilder. Originally from Barcelona, Spain, he was born March 12, 1971.

Paco Bautista has competed in the highest echelons of American bodybuilding by placing 20th in the 2002 Mr. Olympia and 16th in the 2006 Mr. Olympia.  Before entering the professional scene in the United States, Paco Bautista was reigning in the European circuit by placing first in two competitions in 1999, The European Amateur Championships and The World Amateur Championships.  In the United States he placed 3rd in the Night of Champions competition in 2002 before competing for the first time in the Mr. Olympia competition later that year.  Paco Bautista is best known for his highly developed lower body.

Stats 
 Height: 
 Competition weight:

Competition history 
1999 European Amateur Championships - IFBB, HeavyWeight, 1st
1999 World Amateur Championships - IFBB, HeavyWeight, 1st
2002 Grand Prix England - IFBB, 9th
2002 Grand Prix Holland - IFBB, 19th
2002 Night of Champions - IFBB, 3rd
2002 Olympia - IFBB, 20th
2002 Toronto Pro Invitational - IFBB, 6th
2005 New York Pro Championships - IFBB, 9th
2005 Toronto Pro Invitational - IFBB, 13th
2006 Santa Susanna Pro - IFBB, Winner
2006 Olympia - IFBB, 16th
2007 Europa Supershow - IFBB, Open, 7th
2007 New York Pro Championships - IFBB, 11th
2007 Olympia - IFBB, 16th
2007 Santa Susanna Pro - IFBB, Winner
2008 Houston Pro Invitational - IFBB, 12th
2008 New York Pro Championships - IFBB, Open, 9th
2009 New York Pro Championships - IFBB, Open, 12th
2009 Orlando Show of Champions - IFBB, 6th
2010 European Pro - IFBB, 3rd
2010 Tampa Bay Pro - IFBB, Open, 8th
2013 Arnold Classic Brazil - IFBB, 13th

See also
List of male professional bodybuilders
List of female professional bodybuilders
Mr. Olympia
Arnold Classic

References 
 Paco Bautista (Musclememory.com)

External links
 Paco Bautista in New York (Gallery)
 Paco Bautista Article 
Paco Bautista Gallery

1971 births
Living people
Professional bodybuilders